Nevacolima zodia is a species of snout moth in the genus Nevacolima. It is found in west-central Mexico.

The length of the forewings is about 7 mm. The costal half of the forewings is dusted with white, while the posterior half is pale brown and red suffused with fuscous, or black. The hindwings are smoky fuscous, but darker along the veins and near the costal, outer and posterior margins.

References

Moths described in 1994
Phycitini